Rampage is a 2018 arcade game developed by Adrenaline Amusements and published by Warner Bros. Interactive Entertainment based on the 2018 movie of the same name. It serves as a reboot to the video game franchise, which Warner Bros. owns via their purchase of Midway Games. It is available exclusively at Dave & Buster's and Hollywood Bowl. As in previous games, players take control of gigantic monsters trying to survive against onslaughts of military forces. Each level is completed when a particular city block is completely reduced to rubble. It features redemption game mechanics.

Gameplay
Up to three simultaneous players control gigantic monsters who were formerly normal animals. The game's protagonists are George, a King Kong-like albino gorilla, Lizzie, a Rhedosaurus-like crocodile, and Ralph, a humongous wolf—all accidentally transformed by an experimental pathogen capable of modifying an animal's DNA via CRISPR. As monsters, they need to raze all buildings in a high-rise city to advance to the next level, eating people and destroying helicopters, tanks, taxis, police cars, boats, and trolleys along the way.

Gameplay is largely the same as that of previous games in the franchise but there are a number of differences. Players can now destroy entire buildings much faster than before. A new "evolution" system allows players to collect power-ups and have their on-screen characters grow in size. Also a departure, levels take place in the same city with each new level being in a "background" of the previous one.

References

Video game reboots
Rampage (franchise)
Arcade video games
Video games developed in Canada
2018 video games
Multiplayer and single-player video games
Arcade-only video games